World Premiere is the third studio album by Oakland rap group The Team, released on April 4, 2006. It peaked at number 95 on the Billboard Top R&B/Hip-Hop Albums chart and number 50 on the Billboard Top Independent Albums chart.

Track listing 
 "Let's Go Team!" — 2:28
 "Bottles Up" — 3:35
 "On One" — 4:50
 "Top of the World" — 3:52
 "Touch the Sky" — 3:43
 "Just Go" — 3:36
 "Hyphy Juice" — 3:22
 "Good Girl" (featuring Angelina) — 3:38
 "It's Getting Hot" — 3:39
 "Stuntin' on Ya" — 3:54
 "Addiction" — 3:36
 "Summertime in the Town" — 4:05
 "Ambassadors Night" — 3:10
 "I'm a Player" (featuring D'wayne Wiggins) — 4:55
 "The Definition" — 1:06
 "Sunshine" (featuring Goapele) — 4:13
 "It's Getting Hot [Town Bizznezz Remix]" (featuring Keak Da Sneak, The Delinquents, Richie Rich, Humpty Hump, Too Short, and MC Hammer) — 7:18

Personnel 
 Executive Producers: K.O.A.B. & The Team
 A&R: K.O.A.B. & The Team
 A&R Administration: Taj Mahal
 Project Management: Lee Hayes
 Marketing: K.O.A.B
 Art Direction & Design: Brian Bradley Designs
 Cover Photography: Michael Sexton Photography
 Inside Photography: Kimara Dixon
 Pro-Tools & Sequence Editing: Larry Funk at Funktonics
 Mastered by: Chris Athens at Sterling Sound, NYC
 Legal Council: Roxanne Fritz esq.

References

External links 
 World Premiere at Discogs

2006 albums
West Coast hip hop albums